Forget Magazine is an online Canadian literary magazine founded on Valentines Day, 2001, first based in Charlottetown, now based in Vancouver. It has featured original works of poetry, fiction and journalism by first-time authors and well-known Canadian writers.

In an April 2002 on Forget Magazine, Quill & Quire described editor and founder Kent Bruyneel as "a Jack McClelland in the making."

References

External links
 Forget Magazine

2001 establishments in Canada
Online magazines published in Canada
Poetry magazines published in Canada
Magazines established in 2001
Magazines published in Vancouver
Online literary magazines